Penki is a rural locality (a village) in Golovinskoye Rural Settlement, Sudogodsky District, Vladimir Oblast, Russia. The population was 15 as of 2010.

Geography 
Penki is located on the Soyma River, 9 km northwest of Sudogda (the district's administrative centre) by road. Soyma is the nearest rural locality.

References 

Rural localities in Sudogodsky District